This article lists the Leaders of the Government in the Kingdom of Saxony from 1831 to 1918 and Minister-presidents of the Free State of Saxony since 1918.

List of Minister-Presidents

Kingdom of Saxony (until 1918)

Free State of Saxony (1918–1952) 
Political Party:

Free State of Saxony (1990–present) 
Political Party:

See also
List of rulers of Saxony

Ministers-President
Saxony
Ministers-President